Robert Lee Tolley (September 28, 1892 – November 1, 1972) was a college football player and Southeastern Conference official.

Sewanee
Tolley was a quarterback for the Sewanee Tigers of the University of the South from 1911 to 1914.

1912
Tolley was selected to All-Southern teams in 1912.

1914
In 1914, a year in which he was captain, he led the Sewanee eleven to the first defeat of rival Vanderbilt since 1909. Tolley was awarded a gold football charm to commemorate the 14 to 13 victory. One account reads "For brilliance and beauty of execution, (Tolley's play) has had few equals, if any, in the South, and the Tiger leader retires from the game as the premier quarterback in the S.I.A.A., beyond a doubt." His performance included a 75-yard punt return for a touchdown.

First World War
Tolley served in the First World War.

References

1892 births
1972 deaths
American football quarterbacks
College football officials
Sewanee Tigers football players
All-Southern college football players
People from Fayetteville, Tennessee
Sportspeople from Chattanooga, Tennessee
Players of American football from Tennessee